This is the discography of the American singer Chantay Savage.

Albums

Studio albums

Singles

Soundtracks
 1996: The Associate (on "Yes We Can Can" with Taral Hicks, LaShanda Reese and The Pointer Sisters)
 2006: Bella Nutri (EP) (on "Always Beautiful" and "Shine")

Other Appearances
 2003: "Auto-Eroticism" (with Malik Yusef) (from The Great Chicago Fire: A Cold Day In Hell)
 2006: "September" (with Full Flava) (from Music Is Our Way of Life)
 2012: "Everything Must Change" (with Quill)

References

 
Discographies of American artists
Rhythm and blues discographies